The 2009–10 Sheffield Shield season is the 108th season of official first-class domestic cricket in Australia. The season began on 13 October 2009. The Victorian Bushrangers were the winners of the competition, defeating the Queensland Bulls by 459 runs in the final held from 17 to 21 March 2010 at the Melbourne Cricket Ground

Table

The top two teams after each round is played will compete for the Sheffield Shield final. The match will be contested at the home ground of the side that finishes first. In the result of a draw, the team that finished on top of the ladder, and hence hosting the match will be awarded the title. For an explanation of how points are awarded, see Sheffield Shield Points System.

Last Updated on 15 March 2010.

Teams

Fixtures and results

October

November

December

Mid Season Break

There is a break in the regular schedule of first class games to allow for the 2009–10 KFC Twenty20 Big Bash competition.

January

February

March

Final

Statistics

Most Runs

Last Updated on 22 March 2010

Most Wickets

Last Updated on 22 March 2010

See also
 2009–10 Australian cricket season

References

Sheffield Shield
Sheffield Shield
Sheffield Shield seasons